Miss Teen USA 2009, the 27th Miss Teen USA pageant, was held at the Imperial Ballroom, Atlantis Paradise Island, in Nassau, The Bahamas on July 31, 2009. For the first time since 1986, the Miss Teen USA pageant was held earlier than the Miss Universe pageant. Miss Teen USA 2008, Stevi Perry of Arkansas, crowned Stormi Henley of Tennessee as her successor.

For the first time, the event was webcast live over the Internet via Ustream (on www.missteenusa.com). Ed Fields and Stevi Perry hosted the presentation show, where Seth Goldman and Miss USA 2008, Crystle Stewart hosted the final show. Pop rock band Honor Society and Canadian pop singer, songwriter Leah Renee performed during the two hours live event.

Final results

Placements

Special awards

Finals
The top fifteen was announced during the finals show and went on to compete in the swimsuit competition, and previous to that, the group Honor Society played two songs. Following that, Leah Renee sang "Imaginary Boyfriend" and "Insanity" from her album Storybook. Later the top fifteen went on to compete in the evening gown. After the evening gown competition, Seth Goldman interviewed with the girls on backstage. The top five were announced, and they were asked questions about themselves and questions judges had prepared for them. Each delegate was allowed thirty seconds to answer the question. The judges were allowed one last look at the delegates, and Stevi Perry took her final walk as Miss Teen USA. Then, the runners-up and the winner was announced.

New crown
 (not at this link)
Diamond Nexus Labs created a new crown for Miss Teen USA 2009, replacing the Milkimoto crown that has been worn since 2002.

Delegates
The Miss Teen USA 2009 delegates were:

Judges
Duane Gazi – Director of Scoutingand Development, Trump Model Management.
Eric McLendon – Actor and Realtor, The Corcoran Group.
Eva Chen –  Beauty and Health Editor, Teen Vogue.
Gillian Sheldon Heckendorf – Managing Editor,  Momlogic.com.
Heather Kerzner – Kerzner International, Inc.
John Shea – Commercial Agent, Frontier Booking, Inc.
Mark Turner – Commercial Agent, Abrams Artists.
Rhona Graff – Vice President and Assistant to the President, Trump Organization.

Notes

References

External links
Miss Teen USA official website

2009
2009 in the Bahamas
2009 beauty pageants